Grindelia scabra, the rough gumweed, is a rare North American species of flowering plants in the family Asteraceae. It has been found in northern Mexico (Coahuila) and the southwestern United States (western Texas and southern New Mexico).

Grindelia scabra grows in dry rocky slopes and on top of mesas (flat-topped hills). The plant usually produces numerous flower heads in open flat-topped arrays. Each head has 17-30 ray flowers, surrounding a large number of tiny disc flowers.

References

External links
photo of herbarium specimen at Missouri Botanical Garden, collected in New Mexico in 1897, isotype of Grindelia scabra

scabra
Flora of Coahuila
Flora of New Mexico
Flora of Texas
Plants described in 1898